The battle of Nigoiti took place between 20 and 27 May 1854 the village of Nigoiti in Guria during the Crimean war.

Russo-Georgian detachments, under the command of Ivane Andronikashvili, met an invading Ottoman force that had crossed the Choloki river, the border between the Russian and Ottoman Empires. Ozurgeti, the capital of Guria, had been occupied by the Ottoman since 11 April, and with the Russian victory at Nigoiti it allowed the Russian forces under Andronikashvili to move towards it, leading to the Battle of Choloki on 4 June.

References

Nigoiti
Nigoiti
Nigoiti
19th century in Georgia (country)
1854 in the Ottoman Empire
Nigoiti